Xin actin-binding repeat-containing protein 2 is a protein that in humans is encoded by the XIRP2 gene.

References

Further reading